Wizner is a surname. Notable people with the surname include:

Ben Wizner (born 1971), American lawyer, writer, and civil liberties advocate
Stephen Wizner, American legal scholar

See also
 Weisner
 Winer

Americanized surnames
Surnames of German origin